Juan Eduardo "El Magico" Samudio Serna (born 14 October 1978 in Asunción) is a former Paraguayan footballer.

He held the record for most goals scored in the Paraguayan first division with 108 goals, and is the third maximum goal scorer of Paraguayan football with 119 goals, ahead of Fredy Bareiro (112).

Career
Samudio started his career in the youth divisions of Libertad and made his debut in 1996. While in Libertad the team got relegated to the 2nd division in 1998 but Samudio stayed in the team and helped in obtaining the promotion to 1st division in 2000. After the promotion, Libertad saw success in their return to first division and won two national championships back to back in 2002 and 2003 and was the topscorer of the Paraguayan league in 2002 and 2004.

In 2007, he had a brief stint in Mexico playing for Querétaro FC and returned to Paraguay to play for Guaraní before returning to Libertad to play and win the Apertura 2008 tournament. In July 2008 he was offered a symbolic "lifetime" contract by Libertad because of all his contributions to the team throughout the years. In September 2008 Samudio reached 108 goals in the Paraguayan first division, passing Mauro Caballero and becoming the all-time goalscorer of Paraguayan football.
His current team is Deportivo Independiente Medellin.

Deportivo Independiente Medellin
In the first half of 2011 Samudio signed with Deportivo Independiente Medellin of the Colombian Serie A.
Becoming the last incorporation of Deportivo Independiente Medellin for this first season of La Liga Postobon.

Honours

Titles

Individual
 Third maximum goal scorer of Paraguayan football with 119 goals
Paraguayan 1st Division topscorer in 2002.
Paraguayan 1st Division topscorer in 2004.

See also
 Players and Records in Paraguayan Football

References

External links
 
 Juan Samudio at BDFA.com.ar 
 

1978 births
Living people
Paraguayan footballers
Paraguay under-20 international footballers
Paraguay international footballers
Paraguayan Primera División players
Liga MX players
Ecuadorian Serie A players
Club Libertad footballers
Club Guaraní players
Querétaro F.C. footballers
Sportivo Luqueño players
Paraguayan expatriate footballers
Barcelona S.C. footballers
Expatriate footballers in Ecuador
Expatriate footballers in Mexico
Association football forwards